Wonder Woman of Earth-Two is a fictional DC Comics superheroine, from the original stories by Wonder Woman writer and creator, William Moulton Marston and his wife Elizabeth Holloway Marston. After DC Comics established a multiverse in their published stories, which explained how heroes could have been active before (and during) World War II, retain their youth, and (subsequent) origins during the 1960s, this version of Wonder Woman was retconned merging with the original Wonder Woman who first appeared in All Star Comics #8 (December 1941).

The Earth-Two Wonder Woman was first featured as a character separate from Wonder Woman (known as Earth-One Wonder Woman) in the second Jay Garrick and Barry Allen comic. Earth-Two Wonder Woman had appeared several months earlier in one comic-book panel. Like most of the older Earth-Two incarnations of the DC characters, this version of Wonder Woman was semi-retired when she reappeared in later stories (with gray hair and wrinkles in later Justice League stories). She appeared in many future Earth-Two features, including the multigenerational Infinity, Inc. series featuring her daughter, Fury.

She (and her version of Earth-One) was eliminated in a company-wide storyline, Crisis on Infinite Earths. After this series, she ascended to Earth-Two's Mount Olympus with her husband, General Steve Trevor, reaching godhood. Although Diana Trevor was eliminated due to the storyline's outcome, her daughter was not. Fury (Lyta Trevor) was later revealed as the child of, Helena Kosmatos, the New Earth Fury during World War II. The Earth-Two Diana Trevor reappeared in mainstream DC Earth in Infinite Crisis as an apparition, fading away after speaking to her new counterpart Wonder Woman.

Another storyline, 52, was created; in its aftermath, alternate versions of the pre-crisis Earth-Two characters were introduced. Although distinct from their pre-crisis Earth-Two versions, they remained generally similar. Post-crisis Earth-Two Wonder Woman was mentioned by her daughter Fury but appears only in a picture taken before the death of Bruce Wayne and the disappearance of Superman. Post-crisis Earth-2 Wonder Woman retired from her Earth's Justice Society team, and the comic suggests she is the current Queen of the Amazons; this did not happen to Earth-Two Diana Trevor before she ascended Mount Olympus to become a goddess with her husband.

A parallel character was scheduled to appear in the 2012 series Earth-2. The post-flashpoint Earth-2 Wonder Woman was the sole surviving Amazon of her source Earth, but the fate of the other Amazons of post-flashpoint Earth-2 is unknown.

Fictional character biography
Princess Diana of Paradise Island—the Wonder Woman of Earth-Two—is a member of the All-Star Squadron and secretary (and later a member) for the Justice Society of America. As Diana Prince, she works in the U.S. War Department as an assistant to intelligence officer Steve Trevor. Decades later she and Trevor marry and have a daughter, Lyta (also known as Fury). Although Diana is retconned out of existence in Crisis on Infinite Earths and All-Star Squadron #60, she is later restored to the present.

Early history
Diana, Princess of the Amazons of Earth-Two, was born on the mystical Paradise Island several hundred years before becoming known as Wonder Woman. Isolated from the cruelty and corruption of men, the Amazons lived and worked in peace and obeyed the will of Aphrodite and Athena. Longing for a child of her own, Hippolyta (Queen of the Amazons) begged the gods to grant her request and turn her clay statue into a real girl. In sympathy, Aphrodite relented and animated the statue; the girl leaped off the pedestal into her mother's arms. Hippolyta named her for the moon goddess, Diana (who became her godmother).

Hippolyta raises her daughter as an Amazon, with the privileges of royalty. Diana ages slowly, stopping aging when reaching adulthood (as do all Amazons). She surpasses most of her Amazon sisters in skills and intelligence, running faster than a deer at age five and easily uprooting a tree at three.

Diana is a contented Amazon until Captain Steve Trevor crash-lands on Paradise Island.  Diana is attracted to him (despite his injuries), although she had never seen a man before,. Violating the island rule against taking in outsiders, Diana brings the unconscious Trevor back to the Amazons in an attempt to save his life. In response to her pleas, Hippolyta uses the healing Purple Ray on Trevor and saves his life.

After discovering that the outside world was at war, Diana wants to help stop it. Hippolyta refuses, saying that they should not involve themselves in the ways of outsiders. However, the goddesses Aphrodite and Athena appear to Hippolyta and tell her it is time for an Amazon to travel to "Man's World" and fight the Nazis. Ares feels that he ruled the world; Aphrodite wants to help America win, claiming it is the last citadel of democracy. A tournament is held to determine the Amazon champion; although forbidden by Hippolyta to participate, Princess Diana conceals her identity with a mask. After winning all the contests Diana reveals her identity to her mother, who fears she will never see her daughter again.

However, Hippolyta allows her daughter to dress as Wonder Woman and travel to the outside world. Diana returns Steve Trevor to the United States, adopting the identity of a U.S. Army nurse (Diana Prince) so she can stay with Trevor as he recovered. She helps him against a Japanese agent.

Diana begins to appear publicly as Wonder Woman. As Earth-Two Diana Prince, she joins the U.S. Navy as a lieutenant and becomes Col. Darnell's secretary. In actual Golden Age comics, the character joins the U.S. Army and in one occasion returned to nursing. The real Diana Prince later returns and tries to assume Diana's role, since her inventor husband is having financial trouble selling his weapon to the army. Wonder Woman saves Diana when she is kidnapped by a Japanese agent trying to steal the weapon. Diana Prince begins using her married name, leaving Wonder Woman in her identity.

Diana continues fighting crime with the Justice Society of America (on Earth-Two) as their first female member, although she is relegated to secretarial work for the Justice Society (despite her superpowers). She is shown taking dictation and typing the team's minutes as Wonder Woman. Diana rejoins the team when it reforms and expands as the All-Star Squadron. She continues fighting crime after the war and resists being recalled to Paradise Island, preferring to surrender her immortality rather than her independence.

Marriage
During the 1950s, Diana continues fighting crime; she admits no secret identity, admitting she was an Amazon (unlike many other masked heroes, who are forced to reveal their identities by the federal government's committee on un-American activities). However, she continues to use the alias Diana Prince.

During this period, Diana explores her romantic interest in her longtime crime-fighting partner, Steve Trevor. Diana reveals herself as Wonder Woman to him; although initially taken aback, Trevor marries her. Diana later retires from active duty in the Navy and becomes a housewife, raising their daughter Hippolyta "Lyta" Trevor (named after Diana's mother).

Later adventures
Diana rejoins the (reformed) Justice Society of America during the 1960s; she is one of the JSA members placed in suspended animation by JSA villain Vandal Savage, and is freed by Barry Allen. However, she prefers to spend her time at home raising her daughter. During this time, Earth-Two Diana meets her younger Earth-One counterpart. She is later summoned by the god Mercury (with other heroes of Earth-2, Earth-1, and Earth-S) when beast-man Kull of Atlantis wants to destroy humanity on all three piles of the earth after capturing the elders (who empowered the Marvel Family). She helps stop Queen Clea, one of his henchmen, from taking over the Earth-Two Atlantis in a story involving the Squadron of Justice. The Wonder Women become good friends.

Diana is one of the Justice Society members ambushed by her earth's Superman (under the control of the Ultra Humanite) and drowned in Koehaha, the river of evil. She, Superman, Hawkman, Green Lantern, Robin, and the Atom commit a number of crimes as they seek to act on their deepest desires, and fight their children/proteges (the newly formed Infinity Inc) in the process. Diana fights her daughter to a standstill and nearly kills Hawkman's son, the Silver Scarab, while trying to rob a museum. Her goal is to obtain a rare herb said to confer eternal life and give it to her husband so that she won't have to face decades alone when Steve inevitably dies before she does. She accidentally injures Steve in the battle and takes him to Paradise Island for healing. Eventually, Diana and her teammates are freed from the water's influence, and she goes back to her retirement with a recovering Steve.

Crisis on Infinite Earths
Diana continues in her role as an elder stateswoman in the superhero community until the Crisis on Infinite Earths came to Earth-Two and erases its existence. She fights well and is protected from erasure at the end of the crisis by ascending to Mount Olympus with her husband. Both are forgotten by the history of the new Primary Earth, except for their daughter (who is reformatted into the new universe as the daughter of Helena Kosmatos: Fury of World War II).

Infinite Crisis

When the new, post-crisis Wonder Woman breaks up a riot in Boston, she is interrupted by a woman she thinks is her mother (Queen Hippolyta); Hippolyta is the golden-age Wonder Woman via time travel in her continuity. The intruder identifies herself as Earth-Two Wonder Woman Diana Prince, who left Mount Olympus in order to guide Diana. She advises her post-Crisis counterpart to be "the one thing you haven't been for a very long time...human". She urges Diana to intervene in a fight between Superman and his counterpart, Kal-L. Having left Mount Olympus, with her gods' blessings gone, Diana Prince fades away.

The New 52
In September 2011, The New 52 rebooted DC's continuity. In this new timeline, the Earth 2 Wonder Woman is the last of the Amazons and is violent and bitter as a result. She is killed by Steppenwolf in the battle for Earth with Apokolips, when she tries to buy time for Bruce Wayne. This Princess Diana is revealed to have had a daughter. The daughter as an adult has taken the name of Fury, reflecting the storyline of the original pre-Crisis Earth-Two Wonder Woman and her daughter.

Powers
Earth-Two Wonder Woman has superhuman speed, strength, agility and accuracy. Her speed and agility are as great as the god Mercury, but less than the pre-crisis Earth-Two Flash (as in her battle with Garrick, when she is possessed by the Stream of Ruthlessness). She can leap , an Amazon record. She is originally immortal; however, to stay in a "man's world" after her mission she surrenders her immortality and begins to age as a normal human. She can glide on wind currents but rarely uses this gliding ability, preferring to depend on her invisible plane to travel long distances at great speed.

Imbued with the strength of Hercules, the Earth-Two Wonder Woman is strong enough to rip steel-door off their hinges with little to no effort, easily uproot might Oak trees, and lift elephants and massive rocks as if they were cardboard boxes. Her strength is comparable with the Earth-Two Superman. She has more resistance than a human; an electrical current which would kill a normal human only knocks her out.
Diana demonstrates knowledge of every terrestrial language and advanced scientific knowledge. She hypnotizes Etta Candy's brother Mint, although her magic lasso (unlike the modern version) gives her mind control over others. Her Amazon training gives her hand-to-hand combat skills, useful for wrestling and binding opponents. Wonder Woman can telepathically communicate with the Holiday Girls with a mental radio (which can also be used by Etta Candy), and her knowledge of psychology can heal minds. She has magnetic hearing due to her earrings, which were given to her by the Venusian fairy Queen Desira for stopping the Meteor Men from attacking her planet.

In other media

Television
 In 1976, an hour-long Wonder Woman television series premiered on ABC (after the success of its 1975 pilot film, The New Original Wonder Woman). Lynda Carter was cast in the title role, with Lyle Waggoner as Steve Trevor. Using the World War II era as its setting during Season 1, the series features elements of the Earth-Two version of Wonder Woman, including Trevor's plane crash on Paradise Island, Princess Diana's tournament victory and departure for Man's World (via the invisible plane) and the Amazon's secret identity in the War Department as Diana Prince (details of the character's origin involving her birth were omitted). Most of the villains are Nazis and Nazi sympathizers, including Baroness Paula von Gunther (portrayed by Christine Belford).

Despite strong ratings ABC delayed commissioning a second season, causing the show's production company (Warner Bros.) to offer Wonder Woman to CBS, one of ABC's primary rival networks. CBS agreed to pick up the series, if the setting was updated to the 1970s. Its title was changed to The New Adventures of Wonder Woman, and the series continued until its cancellation in 1979.

 In 1978, the animated television series Challenge of the Super Friends depicts the origin of Wonder Woman in detail. Although the Super Friends were a child-friendly version of Earth-One's Justice League of America, the episode depicts Princess Diana winning the tournament and traveling to the United States in 1941 (coinciding with the character's Earth-Two history).

Film

 Wonder Woman appears in Justice Society: World War II, voiced by Stana Katic. This version is the leader of the Justice Society of America on another Earth. As per current trend (starting with Gal Gadot's live-action depiction of her in the DCEU), she has a Greek accent.

Notes

References

External links
JSA Fact File: Wonder Woman
Earth-2 Wonder Woman Index
Amazon Archives
Earth-Two Wonder Woman Biography & Chronology

DC Comics Amazons
DC Comics characters with accelerated healing
DC Comics characters with superhuman senses
DC Comics characters with superhuman strength
DC Comics characters who can move at superhuman speeds
DC Comics characters who have mental powers
DC Comics female superheroes
DC Comics deities
DC Comics martial artists
DC Comics telepaths
Wonder Woman characters
Earth-Two
United States-themed superheroes
Comics characters introduced in 1963
Fictional shield fighters
Fictional goddesses
Fictional queens
Fictional rope fighters
Fictional women soldiers and warriors